is a Japanese figure skating coach and former competitor. She competed in ice dancing with Tadayuki Takahashi from 1979. They placed 17th in the 1984 Winter Olympic Games. She was six-time Japanese national champion from 1980 to 1985.

Competitive highlights

See also 
Figure skating at the 1984 Winter Olympics

References 
Japan Figure Skating Instructor Association

1959 births
Living people
Japanese female ice dancers
Olympic figure skaters of Japan
Figure skaters at the 1984 Winter Olympics
Japanese figure skating coaches
Female sports coaches
Figure skating choreographers